Rubrepeira is a genus of orb-weaver spiders containing the single species, Rubrepeira rubronigra. It was first described by Herbert Walter Levi in 1992, found from Mexico to Brazil.

References

Araneidae
Monotypic Araneomorphae genera
Spiders of Central America
Spiders of Mexico
Spiders of South America